Julian Hill is an Australian politician.

Julian Hill may also refer to:

Julian Hill, namesake of Julian, West Virginia
Julian W. Hill, American chemist
Julian Hill (mayor) on List of mayors of Port Phillip

See also
Julien Hill, American football coach
Julian Penniston-Hill, businessman